Vista del Lago High School is located in Moreno Valley, California. It is one of four comprehensive high schools in the Moreno Valley Unified School District.

History
Vista del Lago opened in 2002 as a school for the 9th and 10th grade only. Today 2,000-3,000 students attend there every year for every grade level. In June 2011 the largest class of seniors graduated. The population of the school 47% Hispanic, 32% black, 11%  of 2 or more races/ethnicities, 8% Asian, and 2% white.

School profile
Vista del Lago High School is the fifth high school in Moreno Valley Unified School District and the fourth comprehensive high school. Moreno Valley was incorporated in 1984 and has a population of approximately 193,365.

Vista del Lago opened in 2002-2003 with a student population of 1327. The school opened with 9th and 10th grade students only, and half of the projected complement of staff. In 2003-2004 another grade level was added, and as of the school year 2004-2005 it was a comprehensive 9-12 high school with 2268 students.

The projected API score was 609 for year 2006-2007. Vista del Lago received 605 and for 2007- 2008, the projected score is 615. Vista del Lago received a 3-year preliminary WASC accreditation spring of 2006.

The student demographic of Vista del Lago for 2006-2007 shows that 55% of students are Hispanic or Latino, 26% are African American, 13% are White, 3% are Asian American, 2% are Filipino-American, and less than one percent Pacific Islander, American Indian or Alaska native or other. The staff is composed of 118 teachers with 92% of them being fully credentialed. 2% are emergency credential. All classes averaged between 25 and 34 students per class. There are six academic counselors servicing over 410 students per counselor.

In 2015 Vista del Lago had a graduation rate of 91.1%, the highest of the district's high schools.

Academics
Vista del Lago offers four "pathways" or concentrations: Visual/Performing Arts, Engineering, Health Career, and Business, the AVID college-prep program, and a Middle College Program in coordination with the Riverside Community College District; Moreno Valley College works with students on STEM subjects under a federal grant. Vista del Lago currently holds #2437 in National High School Ranking and show college readiness score of 24.4/100.

Alumni
Tristin Mays, actor

References

External links
 

Education in Moreno Valley, California
High schools in Riverside County, California
Public high schools in California
2002 establishments in California